= Yashodhara Lal =

Indian author

- Occupation: Author
- Writing career
- Genres: Fiction, romantic comedy
- Notable works: When Love Finds You (2016); How I Became A Farmer's Wife (2018)
- Website: www.yashodharalal.com

Yashodhara Lal is an Indian author best known for her book How I Became A Farmer's Wife published in 2018 by HarperCollins. Her book When Love Finds You was published in 2016 by Harlequin India.

== Works ==
Lal's other books include There's Something About You (2015), Sorting Out Sid (2014), and Just Married, Please Excuse (2012). Yashodhara has also authored two children's book, entitled Peanut has a Plan (2016)., and "Peanut vs. the Piano", the sequel. The books are based on her daughter and twin sons. Lal refers to them as 'Peanut, Pickle, and Papad'. Her newest book, "Those Days In Delhi", was published in June 2019.
